The Bunkhouse Coffeehouse, downstairs at 612 Davie Street in Vancouver, British Columbia, Canada, was an influential venue for folk music and poetry readings in the 1960s.

Some of the performers at The Bunkhouse included Josh White, Sonny Terry and Brownie McGhee, Jose Feliciano, 3's a Crowd, David Wiffen, Brent Titcomb, Tom Northcott, Ann Mortifee, Gary Fjelgard, Joe Mock, Yeoman, The Travellers, and Blake Emmons, as well as impressionist Rich Little and comedian Pat Paulson.

Sonny Terry and McGhee recorded one of their best known albums there : At The Bunkhouse (Smash, 1965). Having moved to Vancouver, Wiffen was invited to perform at The Bunkhouse club on a live ensemble album.  It became Wiffen's first solo album, At The Bunkhouse Coffeehouse (Universal International, 1965), when the other invited musicians failed to show up.
Gerry Berg of Yeoman said "We were the first group to play for Les Stork at the Bunkhouse in Vancouver. Blake Emmons got his start there and played the second week after us."

Proprietor Les Stork operated The Bunkhouse, which served coffee and pizza, but did not serve alcohol.

References

External links 

  Flat Five and Blue Horn (& The Bunkhouse), Vancouver Jazz History Forum 

Music venues in Vancouver
Former music venues in Canada